Pelecanus odessanus is a large species of fossil pelican, described in 1886 from Late Miocene fossil material since lost, from Novaja Slobodka, near Odesa in the Ukraine.

References

Pelecanus
Miocene birds
Fossil taxa described in 1886
Prehistoric birds of Europe